Ina Césaire (born in 1942 in Martinique) is a French playwright and ethnographer. In her 1981 article "Littérature orale et contes", "she discusses how Caribbean story tales are true 'révélateur' of that [Caribbean] spirit and affirms that the role of Caribbean folktale is to represent the culture." 

She is the daughter of Aimé Césaire. Her mother, Suzanne Césaire, was a French writer from Martinique whose work is connected with the Francophone Negritude movement.

Works

Plays
Mémoires d'Isles, Maman N. et Maman F. Paris: Editions Caribéennes, 1985.
L'Enfant des Passages ou la Geste de Ti-Jean. Paris: Editions Caribéennes, 1987.
La Maison close (inéd.). création 1991.
Rosanie Soleil. Paris: Soc. Des Auteurs et Compositeurs Dramatiques, 1992. création 1992.

In English
"Island Memories". Translation, Christiane Makward et J. Miller. Plays by French and Francophone Women. Ann Arbor: University of Michigan Press, 1994: 49–74. 
"Fire's Daughters (Rosanie Soleil)". Translation. Judith G. Miller: New French Language Plays. New York: Ubu Repertory Theatre, 1993: 1–53.

Novels
Zonzon Tête Carrée. Monaco: Ed. du Rocher, 1994 ; Monaco: Alphée/Le Serpent à Plumes, 2004.

Reviews

Miyasaki, June, "Writing the Landscape of Memory: Ina Cesaire's Memoires d'Isles", Journal of Caribbean Literatures, June 22, 2009.

References

External links
"Frameworks For Interpreting French Caribbean Women's Theatre", Theatre Survey (2009), 50: 67–90.
"Two Plays by Ina Césaire: Mémoires d'Isles and L'enfant des Passages", Theatre Research International, (1990), 15: 223–233.
Vanessa Lee, Four Caribbean Women Playwrights: Ina Césaire, Maryse Condé, Gerty Dambury and Suzanne Dracius (Palgrave Macmillan, 2021)

1942 births
Living people
French women dramatists and playwrights
Martiniquais women writers
Martiniquais writers